Aboubacar Cissé (born July 28, 1969, in Abidjan, Côte d'Ivoire) is an Ivorian former professional footballer. He played as a midfielder.

External links
Aboubacar Cissé profile

1969 births
Living people
Ivorian footballers
Association football midfielders
FC Sète 34 players
Nîmes Olympique players
OGC Nice players
Chamois Niortais F.C. players
Ligue 1 players
Ligue 2 players
Stade Beaucairois players
Footballers from Abidjan